Judah Menachem Miller (born November 14, 1973) is an American producer, writer, and filmmaker. Miller has produced and written for Clone High (2002), The Tracy Morgan Show (2003), A.U.S.A. (2003), Committed (2005), Stacked (2005), King of the Hill (2006), American Dad! (2010), Axe Cop (2012), and Crashing (2017).

Early life
Miller was born to a Jewish family, the son of Zoe and Gary Miller. He is a graduate of Monte Vista High School in Danville, California. He has a twin sister, Geneva Miller Wasserman and one brother, writer Murray Miller. He started his career as a production assistant in Los Angeles.

Personal life
On October 7, 2006, Miller married Marissa Jaret Winokur. They have one son, Zev Isaac Miller (born 2008).

Filmography

Television

Awards and nominations

References

External links
 

Jewish American screenwriters
Living people
1973 births
Television producers from California
Screenwriters from California
21st-century American Jews
Jewish American television producers